Ninos Gouriye (born 14 January 1991) is a Dutch footballer who currently plays as a winger.

He formerly played for the Dutch Eerste Divisie club Cambuur as a forward.

Personal life 
Gouriye's brothers, Sargon and Teglat, and his cousin Arthur, are also footballers.

Ninos is of Syrian descent.

Career statistics

Honours

Club 
Astra Giurgiu
 Liga I: 2015–16

References

External links
 Voetbal International profile 
 

1991 births
Living people
Dutch people of Syrian descent
Dutch people of Assyrian/Syriac descent
Syrian Christians
Sportspeople from Hengelo
Association football forwards
Dutch footballers
FC Twente players
Expatriate men's footballers in Denmark
Heracles Almelo players
ADO Den Haag players
Excelsior Rotterdam players
FC Astra Giurgiu players
SC Cambuur players
Vendsyssel FF players
Eredivisie players
Danish Superliga players
Eerste Divisie players
Liga I players
Dutch expatriate footballers
Expatriate footballers in Romania
Assyrian footballers
HVV Tubantia players
Dutch expatriate sportspeople in Romania
Dutch expatriate sportspeople in Denmark
Dutch expatriate sportspeople in Austria
Expatriate footballers in Austria
Footballers from Overijssel